ʿUmar ibn ʿAlī, also known as ʿUmar al-Aṭraf, was reportedly one of the children of Ali ibn Abi Talib who accompanied his brother, Husayn ibn Ali, to Karbala and was killed on the day of Ashura.

Lineage 
Some Sunni sources have mentioned Umar as Umar al-Akbar whose tekonym was Abu al-Qasim or Abu Hafs. Some historical source reported the name of his mother as Al-Sahba (Umm Habib), daughter of Rabi'a al-Taghlibi. Some others have mentioned her name as Layla bt. Mas'ud al-Darami. The Sunni scholar al-Fakhr al-Razi mentioned that Umar was the youngest child of Imam Ali.

In the Battle of Karbala 
It is reported that Umar made war cries on the Day of Ashura and attacked the enemy. He attacked Zahr, the killer of his brother and killed him. The Sunni jurist Akhtab Khwarazm reported his martyrdom after the martyrdom of his brother Abu Bakr. It is said that first, his horse fell down and then they martyred him.

References 

People killed at the Battle of Karbala
Husayn ibn Ali
Hussainiya
680 deaths
Children of Rashidun caliphs
Children of Ali
Family of Muhammad